Stadionul Regie, also known as Stadionul Sportul, is a multi-purpose stadium in Bucharest, Romania.  It is used mostly for football matches and was the home ground of Sportul Studențesc București for 94 years. The stadium has 10,020 seats.

History
The stadium was built in the 1920s, and until the Second World War, it belonged to Belvedere FC. During that time, the stadium had only one West stand and also an oval athletic track around the pitch. In 1955, the stadium changed ownership from CAM (Casa Autonomă a Monopulului) to the Ministry of Education. Consequently, the Polytechnic Institute of Bucharest and its football club, Știinta (later Politehnica, and now Sportul Studențesc), was allowed to train and play their home games here.

The stadium was renovated for the first time in 1972 after Sportul Studențesc was promoted to the Romanian First Division. With the help of then TMUCB Director, Mr. Barbu Emil "Mac" Popescu, the athletic track was removed and the North, South, and East stands were built. Soil excavated from the construction of the Bucharest subway system was used to build the aforementioned stands.

In 2004, following FC Sportul Studențesc's latest promotion to the Romanian First Division, the stadium was renovated yet again in order to meet FIFA's latest safety, occupancy, and access requirements. One of the most noticeable aesthetic changes to the stadium was the installation of white plastic seats, thus reducing its capacity from 15,000 to 10,020.

Notable matches

Sportul Studențesc - Domestic Championship

08.11.2009: Liga II - Sportul Studențesc - Râmnicu Sărat 8-0, Attendance 500 - Largest home win
23.09.2006: Liga II - Sportul Studențesc - Prefab Modelu 0-5, Attendance 200 - Largest home defeat in Liga II
07.05.2003: Liga I - Sportul Studențesc - Dinamo București 5-6, Attendance 2,000 - Most goals in a home defeat
12.03.1997: Liga I - Sportul Studențesc - Dinamo București 0-5, Attendance 7,000 - Largest home defeat in Liga I
03.12.1989: Liga I- Sportul Studențesc - Steaua București 0-5 - Largest home defeat in Liga I
18.06.1986: Liga I - Sportul Studențesc - Olt Scornicești 7-5 - Most goals in one game

Sportul Studențesc - European Cups

09.12.1987: UEFA Cup, 3rd Round, 2nd Leg - Sportul Studențesc - Hellas Verona 0-1(0-0), Attendance 15,000 - Last game in UEFA Cup
04.11.1987: UEFA Cup, 2nd Round, 2nd Leg - Sportul Studențesc - Brøndby 3-0(1-0), Attendance 9,600
15.09.1987: UEFA Cup, 1st Round, 1st Leg - Sportul Studențesc - GKS Katowice 1-0(0-0), Attendance 13,000
22.10.1986: UEFA Cup, 2nd Round, 1st Leg - Sportul Studențesc - KAA Gent 0-3(0-1), Attendance 11,000
17.09.1986: UEFA Cup, 1st Round, 1st Leg - Sportul Studențesc - Omonia Nicosia 1-0(0-0), Attendance 10,000
03.12.1985: UEFA Cup, 1st Round, 2nd Leg - Sportul Studențesc - Neuchâtel Xamax 4-4(4-2), Attendance 14,000 - First game in UEFA Cup

Romanian Cup Finals
30.04.1994: Gloria Bistrita - FC U Craiova 1-0(1-0), Attendance 7,000
24.06.1992: Steaua București - Politehnica Timișoara 3-2(1-1,1-1), Attendance 8,000

Romanian Super Cup Finals
05.08.1995: Steaua București - Petrolul Ploiesti 2-0(1-0), Attendance 10,000

References

Football venues in Romania
Sports venues in Bucharest
Multi-purpose stadiums in Romania
FC Rapid București
FC Sportul Studențesc București